Occupational Therapy in Health Care is a peer-reviewed healthcare journal covering occupational therapy. It is published by Informa and is edited by Anne E. Dickerson (East Carolina University).

Occupational Therapy in Health Care was established in 1984 and is published 4 times a year.

References

External links 
 

Occupational therapy journals
Taylor & Francis academic journals
Quarterly journals
Publications established in 1984
English-language journals
Occupational safety and health journals